The German name Friedrich Wilhelm may refer to:

People

Hohenzollern kings
Frederick William I of Prussia (16881740)
Frederick William II of Prussia (17441797)
Frederick William III of Prussia (17701840)
Frederick William IV of Prussia (17951861)

Other nobility
Frederick William, Elector of Brandenburg (16201688), Duke of Prussia
Friedrich Wilhelm, Prince of Hohenzollern-Hechingen (16631735), imperial Field Marshal
Friedrich Wilhelm, Duke of Saxe-Meiningen (16791746)
Frederick William, Margrave of Brandenburg-Schwedt (17001771)
Friedrich Wilhelm von Haugwitz (17021765), Supreme Chancellor of the United Court Chancery
Margrave Frederick William of Brandenburg-Schwedt (17151744)
Friedrich Wilhelm, Graf von Wylich und Lottum (17161774), Prussian officer and Commandant of Berlin
Friedrich Wilhelm, Fürst zu Hohenlohe-Kirchberg (17321796)
Friedrich Karl Wilhelm, Fürst zu Hohenlohe (17521814)
Frederick William, Duke of Brunswick-Wolfenbüttel (17711815)
Frederick William, Duke of Schleswig-Holstein-Sonderburg-Glücksburg (17851831)
Friedrich Wilhelm, Count Brandenburg (17921850), Prussian general and politician
Frederick William, Grand Duke of Mecklenburg-Strelitz (18191904)
Prince Frederick William of Hesse-Kassel (18201884)
Friedrich Wilhelm von Hohenzollern, German Crown Prince (18821951)
Friedrich Wilhelm, Prince of Hohenzollern (19242010)
Prince Friedrich Wilhelm of Lippe (born 1947)

Other people
Friedrich Wilhelm Argelander (17991875), Prussian astronomer
Friedrich-Wilhelm Graefe zu Baringdorf (born 1942), politician
Friedrich Wilhelm Bessel (17841846), mathematician and astronomer
Friedrich Wilhelm Freiherr von Bülow (17551816), Prussian general
Friedrich Wilhelm von Buxhoeveden (17591811), Russian general
Friedrich Wilhelm August Fröbel, (17821852), educationist
Friedrich Wilhelm Eduard Gerhard (17951867), archaeologist
Friedrich Wilhelm Gotter (17461797), poet
Friedrich Wilhelm Hackländer (18161877), writer
Friedrich Wilhelm Hemprich (17961825), naturalist and explorer
Friedrich Wilhelm Kalkbrenner (17841849), pianist and composer
Friedrich Wilhelm Kasiski (18051881), officer, cryptologist, and archaeologist
Friedrich Wilhelm Georg Kohlrausch (18401910), physicist
Friedrich Wilhelm Kritzinger (18901947), Nazi politician
Friedrich-Wilhelm Krüger (18941945), Nazi officer
Friedrich Wilhelm Ludwig Leichhardt (18131848?), explorer
Friedrich Wilhelm Murnau (18881931), silent film director
Friedrich Wilhelm Nietzsche (18441900), philologist and philosopher
Friedrich Wilhelm Raiffeisen (18181888), cooperative leader
Friedrich Wilhelm Ritschl (18061876), scholar
Friedrich Wilhelm Rüstow (18211878), Swiss soldier
Friedrich Wilhelm Schadow (17891862), painter
Friedrich Wilhelm Joseph Schelling (17751854), philosopher
Friedrich Wilhelm Schirmer (18021866), artist
Friedrich Wilhelm Schneidewin (18101856), classicist
Friedrich Wilhelm von Seydlitz (17211773), Prussian cavalry general
Friedrich Wilhelm von Steuben (17301794), Prussian officer
Friedrich Wilhelm Thiersch (17841860), educationist
Friedrich Wilhelm Zachow (16631712), composer

Other uses
SMS Kurfürst Friedrich Wilhelm, Imperial German ship
Friedrich-Wilhelms-Universität, an older name of the Humboldt University of Berlin
Rheinische Friedrich-Wilhelms-Universität zu Bonn am Rhein, the German name of the University of Bonn

See also
Frederick William (disambiguation)
Frederick William I (disambiguation)